Paul Vander Haar (born 7 March 1958) is a former Australian rules footballer who played 201 games with Essendon in the Victorian Football League (VFL). 

Born of Dutch migrants, Vander Haar was educated at Whitefriars College. During his playing career his surname was normally spelled as three words: Paul Van Der Haar.

Vander Haar was recruited to Essendon from Ringwood in 1977, and was named as the VFL's Recruit of the Year (now known as AFL rising star award). He also won the club's 'Best First Year Player' award and was runner up in their 'Best and Fairest'. In 1978, his form was negatively affected by neck and back injuries resulting from a trail-bike accident. He returned from this serious injury to be one of Essendons star players, achieving State selection and was runner up in Essendon's best and fairest in 1982.   

Due to his strong and spectacular overhead marking ability and ancestry, Vander Haar earned the nickname 'The Flying Dutchman'. He usually played as a centre half-forward but was also used in defence.

Vander Haar was one of the most important players in the champion Essendon team of the 1980s which played in finals in 8 of 11 years. This included grand final appearances in 1983-1985 and back to back premierships in 1984 - 1985. 

In 1985 Vander Haar kicked a career-best 46 goals, 9 of them in a single game in round 21. He earned 12 Brownlow Medal votes for the year. Out of the Essendon players, this was second only to Tim Watson. Despite his goal-scoring feats, he played as a defender in their Grand Final victory that year. Vander Haar was runner up (for the 3rd time in his career) in the Essendon best and fairest in 1985. He also represented Victoria in 1985. 

Injury again struck early in 1986 when he broke his leg. He only managed a total of 10 games in his next two seasons. His playing career was hampered further in 1987 and 1988 by numerous injuries. 

In 1989, Essendon finished second on the ladder in the home-and-away season. He kicked 5 goals in the winning Qualifying final team against Geelong. Vander Haar was back to his best when, in the Second Semi-Final against the reigning premiers Hawthorn, he was knocked out by Hawthorn enforcer Dermott Brereton. The concussion was serious enough for Vander Haar to miss the Preliminary Final against Geelong, in which Essendon were thrashed. To this day, Vander Haar harbours no ill-feelings towards Brereton, and even built a pool and spa for him a couple of years later. "That's the way the game was. I was the unfortunate one on the wrong end of it," he said.

Vander Haar's final match was the 1990 AFL Grand Final, which Essendon lost to Collingwood by 48 points. 

In Kevin Sheedy's book A touch of Cunning, Sheedy wrote "He (Vander Haar) was one of the most courageous footballers I ever saw". Sheedy also wrote "The best four players I coached in the early days were Terry Daniher, Tim Watson, Simon Madden and Paul Vander Haar, in no particular order".  

Since retiring, Vander Haar has followed in his father's footsteps as a tradesman, installing family swimming pools and spas around southern Victoria.

Vander Haar's son Todd plays football for Surrey Park, and is a member of the James Hird Academy.
 
In 2002 he was named as one of the top 60 Champions of Essendon.

References

External links

1958 births
Living people
Australian rules footballers from Victoria (Australia)
Essendon Football Club players
Essendon Football Club Premiership players
Victorian State of Origin players
Australian people of Dutch descent
Two-time VFL/AFL Premiership players